Dr. Thokchom Meinya (born 12 October 1945) is a former member of the Lok Sabha who is currently serving his third consecutive term. He represented the Inner Manipur constituency of Manipur and won the 2004, 2009 and 2014 elections, as a candidate of the Indian National Congress (INC) political party.

References

External links
 Official biographical sketch in Parliament of India website
  The Thokchom Clan

1945 births
Living people
India MPs 2004–2009
Meitei people
People from Imphal West district
India MPs 2009–2014
Lok Sabha members from Manipur
India MPs 2014–2019
Manipur politicians